Gunilla "Gulli" Antoinetta von Düben (17 February 1862 – 4 May 1923) was a Swedish baroness, teacher, translator, writer and stiftsjungfru.

Early life 
Gunilla von Düben was born into the baronial von Düben family on 17 February 1862 in Brännkyrka, Stockholm, Sweden, the daughter of Baron August von Düben, who was half-German, and Baroness Adamina von Düben, née von Vegesack. Von Düben graduated from the Royal Seminary in 1896 as teacher.

Career and literary production 
In the early 20th-century, von Düben translated books that were written in German into Swedish. Moreover, she also self-wrote books. In 1916, she published The Dream of Point Loma.

In addition, she was co-author of the weekly Swedish-language magazine Idun.

Personal life 
Von Düben was a friend, as well as relative of renown writer Verner von Heidenstam.

Von Düben had no issue and did not end up marrying.

Published works 

 Drömmen om Point Loma: ett år i Katherine Tingleys tjänst  (1916)
 Hon som aldrig gjorde någon ledsen (1904)

References

Bibliography 

 
 

19th-century Swedish journalists
Swedish baronesses
1863 births
1923 deaths
Journalists from Stockholm
Swedish translators
20th-century Swedish writers
19th-century Swedish writers
Swedish people of German descent
German–Swedish translators
20th-century Swedish journalists
Gunilla